Alejandra Llaneza Gomez-Palacio (born 31 May 1988) is a Mexican professional golfer who has played on the U.S.-based LPGA Tour ands Symetra Tour and was a 2016 Olympian.

Amateur career
Born and raised in Mexico City, Llaneza began playing golf at the age of 6 years old. She played college golf at the University of Arizona where she was Rookie of the Year in 2007–08.

Professional career
Llaneza played on the Symetra Tour from 2012 to 2014. She has had eight top-10 finishes on the tour.

Llaneza joined the LPGA Tour in 2013. Her best finish is T-12 at the 2014 Kingsmill Championship.

Professional wins

Symetra Tour wins
2015 Self Regional Healthcare Foundation Women's Health Charity Classic
2019 Garden City Charity Classic

Other wins
2011 Wigwam Cactus Tour event (as an amateur)
2017 Pennsylvania Women's Open

References

External links
 

 
 
 Alejandra Llaneza Gomez at the 2019 Pan American Games

Mexican female golfers
Arizona Wildcats women's golfers
LPGA Tour golfers
Olympic golfers of Mexico
Golfers at the 2016 Summer Olympics
Golfers at the 2019 Pan American Games
Pan American Games competitors for Mexico
Sportspeople from Mexico City
1988 births
Living people